Ding Dong is a chocolate snack cake marketed under the Hostess brand name.

Ding dong is an onomatopoeia for the sound that a standard doorbell makes.

Ding Dong or Dingdong may also refer to:

Music

Groups
 The Ding Dongs, the group name under which "Early in the Morning" was originally released

Albums
 Ding Dong, a 1976 jazz album by Vic Dickenson
 Ding Dong (Joe Nina album), album by Joe Nina 1996
 Ding Dong, a 2000 album by Lester Young
 Ding Dong, a 2000 album by Jeans Team
 Ding Dong!, a 2013 album by Krista Siegfrids

Songs
 "Ding-Dong! The Witch Is Dead", a 1939 song from the film The Wizard of Oz
 "Ding Dong" (Freddie Bell And The Bellboys song) 1953 song, also "Giddy Up a Ding Dong" 1956
 "Ding Dong" (Dana International song), which represented Israel in the Eurovision Song Contest 2011 in Germany
 "Ding Dong", a 1996 song by Joe Nina from album of the same name
 "Ding Dong", a 2011 song by Robbie Rivera featuring Sue Cho
 "Ding Dong", a song by Irving Berlin
 "Ding Dong!", a song by American drag queen Katya from her debut EP Vampire Fitness
 "Ding Dong, Ding Dong", a 1974 song by George Harrison
 "Ding Dong Merrily on High", a 1924 Christmas carol
 "Ding-a-dong", the winning song in the Eurovision Song Contest 1975 sung by Teach-In, representing the Netherlands 
 "Ding Dong Song", a 2004 song by Swedish pop singer Günther, featuring The Sunshine Girls
 "Jaja Ding Dong", a track song in the 2020 film Eurovision Song Contest: The Story of Fire Saga

People
 Ding Dong (reggae musician) (born 1980), dancehall performer from Jamaica
 Denise Drysdale (born 1948), Australian television personality affectionately known as "Ding Dong"
 Dingdong Dantes (born 1980), Filipino actor
 Dingdong Avanzado (born 1968), Filipino singer

Places
 Ding Dong, Texas, an unincorporated community in the United States
 Ding Dong mines, in Cornwall

Other uses
 a title character of Winston Steinburger and Sir Dudley Ding Dong, an Australian-Canadian animated children's television series
 The Ding Dongs, a masked professional wrestling tag team played by Greg Evans and Richard Sartain, formerly The Rock n Roll Rebels

See also
 
 Ding Dang (disambiguation)
 Đồng Đăng
 Ding ding (disambiguation)
 Dong Ding tea